Johan Laats (born 10 January 1967) is a Belgian judoka. He competed at the 1988, 1992 and the 1996 Summer Olympics.

Students
Amongst his many students Johan Laats began training Professional UFC Mixed Martial Artist Cindy Dandois at the age of 5.

Achievements

References

External links
 

1967 births
Living people
Belgian male judoka
Judoka at the 1988 Summer Olympics
Judoka at the 1992 Summer Olympics
Judoka at the 1996 Summer Olympics
Olympic judoka of Belgium
Goodwill Games medalists in judo
Competitors at the 1994 Goodwill Games
20th-century Belgian people
21st-century Belgian people